Temko is a surname. Notable people with the surname include:

Allan Temko (1924–2006), American architectural critic and writer
Florence Temko (1921–2009), British origami artist
Ned Temko (born 1952), American journalist and newspaper editor

See also
Tomko